Lo Ming-yau (1900–1967) or Luo Mingyou was a Hong Kong entrepreneur and filmmaker, and a pioneer of Chinese cinema. His uncle Lo Wen-kan (羅文榦, Luo Wengan) was a major politician during the early Republican period.

Lo Ming-yau founded the Hwa Peh Film Company (華北電影公司) in Beijing in 1927. In 1930, Hwa Peh Film Company merged with Lai Man-Wai's China Sun Motion Picture Company and a few other companies in Shanghai to become United Photoplay Service, one of the biggest film studios in China.

Selected filmography 

 A Spray of Plum Blossoms (1931), producer
 The Peach Girl (1931), producer
 Little Toys (1933), producer
 The Goddess (1934), producer
 Queen of Sports (1934), producer
 National Customs (1935), co-director and scriptwriter

In popular culture 
Paul Chang Chung portrays Lo Ming-yau in the 1991 film Center Stage.

References

External links 
 
 

1900 births
1967 deaths
Hong Kong film producers
National University of Peking alumni